Brezje pri Ločah is a settlement in the Municipality of Slovenske Konjice in eastern Slovenia. It lies on the edge of the Dravinja Valley east of Slovenske Konjice and north of Loče. The area is part of the traditional Styria region. The municipality is included in the Savinja Statistical Region.

Name
The name of the settlement was changed from Brezje to Brezje pri Ločah in 1953.

References

External links
Brezje pri Ločah at Geopedia

Populated places in the Municipality of Slovenske Konjice